The 1952–53 Oberliga  was the eighth season of the Oberliga, the first tier of the football league system in West Germany and the Saar Protectorate. The league operated in five regional divisions, Berlin, North, South, Southwest and West. The five league champions and the runners-up from the south, north and west then entered the 1953 German football championship which was won by 1. FC Kaiserslautern. It was 1. FC Kaiserslautern's second national championship, having previously won it in 1951.

1. FC Köln set a new Oberliga start record in 1952–53, winning its first eleven games, a mark later equaled by Hannover 96 in 1953–54 and Hamburger SV in 1961–62 but never surpassed.

A similar-named league, the DDR-Oberliga, existed in East Germany, set at the first tier of the East German football league system. The 1952–53 DDR-Oberliga was won by Dynamo Dresden.

Oberliga Nord
The 1952–53 season saw three new clubs in the league, FC Altona 93, Harburger TB and VfB Lübeck, all promoted from the Amateurliga. The league's top scorer was Günter Schlegel of Göttingen 05 with 26 goals.

Oberliga Berlin
The 1952–53 season saw two new clubs in the league, BFC Südring and SC Südwest Berlin, both promoted from the Amateurliga Berlin. The league's top scorer was Alfred Herrmann of Minerva 93 Berlin with 17 goals.

Oberliga West
The 1952–53 season saw two new clubs in the league, SV Sodingen and Borussia München-Gladbach, both promoted from the 2. Oberliga West. The league's top scorer was Hans Schäfer of 1. FC Köln with 26 goals.

Oberliga Südwest
The 1952–53 season saw four new clubs in the league, BFV Hassia Bingen, FV Speyer and VfR Kirn, all promoted from the 2. Oberliga Südwest while Saar 05 Saarbrücken was promoted from the Amateurliga Saarland. The league's top scorer was Fritz Walter of 1. FC Kaiserslautern with 38 goals, the highest total for the five Oberligas in 1952–53.

Oberliga Süd
The 1952–53 season saw two new clubs in the league, TSG Ulm 1846 and BC Augsburg, both promoted from the 2. Oberliga Süd. The league's top scorer was Horst Schade of SpVgg Fürth with 22 goals.

German championship

The 1953 German football championship was contested by the eight qualified Oberliga teams and won by 1. FC Kaiserslautern, defeating VfB Stuttgart in the final. The eight clubs played a home-and-away round of matches in two groups of four. The two group winners then advanced to the final.

Group 1

Group 2

Final

|}

References

Sources
 30 Jahre Bundesliga  30th anniversary special, publisher: kicker Sportmagazin, published: 1993
 kicker-Almanach 1990  Yearbook of German football, publisher: kicker Sportmagazin, published: 1989, 
 DSFS Liga-Chronik seit 1945  publisher: DSFS, published: 2005
 100 Jahre Süddeutscher Fußball-Verband  100 Years of the Southern German Football Federation, publisher: SFV, published: 1997

External links
 The Oberligas on Fussballdaten.de 

1952-53
1
Ger